Urine Junkies is a compilation album by the death metal band Abscess featuring tracks from various demos and EPs. It was released by Relapse Records in 1995.

Track listing
  "Aching Meat"  (4:44)
  "Urine Junkies"  (1:56)
  "Crawled Up From the Sewer"  (1:20)
  "29th Lobotomy"  (1:42)
  "Horny Hag"  (1:14)
  "Depopulation"  (2:04)
  "Zombification"  (3:27)
  "Blacktooth Beast"  (1:57)
  "The Scent of Shit"  (0:50)
  "Altar Toy"  (2:21)
  "Suicide Fuck"  (2:21)
  "Raw Sewage"  (4:07)
  "Die Pig Die"  (2:23)
  "Inbred Abomination"  (1:54)
  "Unquenchable Thirst"  (2:31)
  "Abscess"  (3:05)
  "Bloodsucker"  (2:40)
  "Anally Impaled"  (2:54)

References

Abscess (band) albums
2000 albums
Relapse Records albums